Middle Island may refer to:

Australia
 Middle Island, off the coast of 1770 and Agnes Water, Queensland
Middle Island (South Australia), South Australia
 Middle Island (Warrnambool), south-western Victoria
 Western Australia:
 Middle Island (Lacepede Islands)
 Middle Island (King Sound)
 Middle Island (Barrow Island)
 Middle Island (Houtman Abrolhos)
 Middle Island (Western Australia)

Canada
 Middle Island (Lake Erie), in Ontario, the southernmost point of land in Canada, and part of Point Pelee National Park

United States
 Middle Island (West Virginia), on the Ohio River
 Middle Island, New York, settlement on Long Island
 Middle Island (Lake Huron), Michigan island in Lake Huron

Elsewhere
 Middle Island, archaic 19th century name for New Zealand's South Island
 Middle Island, Tristan da Cunha, small British island in the South Atlantic Ocean
 Middle Island, Hong Kong, off Repulse Bay on southern Hong Kong Island
 Middle Island, Falkland Islands
 King Fahd Causeway's Border Station, artificial island located on the Bahrain–Saudi Arabia border also called Middle Island

See also
 Middle Brother (disambiguation)